Rajathgarh Junction railway station is a railway junction station on Cuttack–Sambalpur line under the Khurda Road railway division of the East Coast Railway zone. The railway station is situated at Rajathgarh, Rahangol in Cuttack district of the Indian state of Odisha.

References

Railway stations in Cuttack district
Khurda Road railway division
Railway junction stations in Odisha